is a 1991 Japanese original video animation series by AIC and Artmic, directed by Masami Ōbari with character designs by Kia Asamiya (working under his real name, Michitaka Kikuchi). Planning for the series started in 1989, but the animation process did not start until 1991. The series was released on DVD in 2001 by Central Park Media in the United States, in 2002 by Happinet Pictures in Japan, and in 1997 by Manga Entertainment in the United Kingdom. Orgun later appeared in the Super Robot Wars W video game.

Plot

Part 1 – The trinity
Tomoru Shindo is a college student from City 5. He sleeps with a device that helps him explore frequencies similar to those emitted by the brain during sleep. Thereby he can record his own and other peoples thoughts and dreams by its amplifying capabilities during sleep. He picks up bits and pieces of information from an unspecified source that is slowly building into a dream of different nuances. Each night it evolves around a woman suppressed by hostile actors in various dimensions and for every scenario the two of them always stumble upon each other and barely slip out of harms way. Puzzled and stricken each morning by the magnitude of the dreams, Tomoru tries to sync his hardware with the beacon. What he doesn´t know when diving deeper and deeper is that the emitter is the fallen champion fighter Orgun that was intercepted and subsequently assassinated on earth´s moon on the way to earth. Pushed out of options and deadly injured after the confrontation the actor as a last resort sent the signals of which some of them Tomoru for time has been exploring. Another thing Tomoru doesn´t know is that he isn´t alone in linking with the resilient back noise of signals. Earth Defense Force (EDF) employee Professor Michi Kanzaki receives signals from the moon. With the help of the super computer ISAC she tries to compile the information in the data. She is aware she doesn´t manage to lock on all the feed in the signal but its enough for her to understand its content - its a blueprint of an alien body! What she sees frightens her and hesitant to continue the work she reluctantly gives way for the military's wishes.

Tomoru is steadily accessing deeper nuances of the compelling dream that comes together as Orgun - an alien madman that reveal to Tomoru parts of his life experiences. Frightened by what the feelings and memories from the fallen warrior show him, Tomoru is dragged into a psychosis. Slowly he is losing grip of his own reality overburdened by the pain and torment from those that once belonged to Orgun. Still the latter is urging Tomoru as an entity in his mind that has taken hold to dive deeper which sends Tomoru on the run. Tomoru is sinking deeper in the recesses of organ´s memories and his urgent message to his spokesperson on earth. Slowly a trinity is taking hold between Tomoru, Professor Kanzaki and memories of Orgun held by Tomoru. What every party ask themselves is why Orgun from such a superior race sat his course to earth... Professor Kanzaki believes she doesn´t want to know the answer to that question. Although if her employer wants to get their way the key to all their questions lies with a plain civilian - a young man that seem to have roamed in and just stole her tall project.

Part 2 – Pursuit
The EDF create robotic suits based on Orgun in order to defend Earth. Orgun and Tomoru meet two of the Evoluder: Leave, who dies protecting Orgun, and Rang, who battles Orgun in anger for his treason. It is revealed that the Evoluder are the descendants of a crewed space mission Earth sent to the Cygnus constellation 200 years earlier, whose crew evolved into mechanical lifeforms due to experiencing millions of years of time dilation during the journey. Some of the Evoluder are telepathically linked to certain humans, such as Tomoru with Orgun and Kumi with the Evoluder's leader, Mhiku.

Part 3 – Showdown
Using their robotic suits, the EDF repels the Evoluder's invasion force. Kumi uses her telekinetic powers to move the Sun so Orgun can save the Earth. Zoa, the Evoluder's military commander, fires the antimatter cannon. Orgun uses his Grand Cross attack to kill Zoa and destroy the cannon. Orgun crashes onto a beach and dies while Tomoru survives. Mhiku resumes ruling the Evoluder, who peacefully leave Earth. Tomoru and Kanzaki walk off into the sunset while Orgun's remains are displayed in a museum.

Characters
Tomoru Shindo / 

Yohko Mitsurugi

I-Zack

Professor Michi Kanzaki

Bannings

Kumi Jefferson / Miku

Commander Zoa

Virgil

Lang

Simmons

Nokku

Music

Polydor K.K., a member of the series' production committee, recommended Susumu Hirasawa, an artist from their roster, to compose music for the series. Hirasawa took the role because of a wish to work with producer Satoshi Koizumi, whose personality drew Hirasawa in after requesting him to dispel the image that anime soundtracks had. The composer was asked to write the anime's main theme first, and it was presented to Koizumi and director Masami Ōbari in late 1990, before animation had started.

Hirasawa wrote and performed all the music for the OVA, in his film score composer debut (previous soundtrack work amounted to commercial jingles and pro wrestling entrance themes). Similarly to his solo albums Water in Time and Space, The Ghost in Science and Virtual Rabbit, Hirasawa mixed together electronic and symphonic sounds, using elements across a broad range of music styles, with a large focus on classical music. At the time, Hirasawa thought of anime and movie soundtracks only as enhancements and not as standalone works, and made the soundtracks considering it as "a job" and "entertainment", employing an epic tone and dramatic exaggeration in his composing. He drew songwriting elements from his solo albums throughout the soundtrack, and used already-made songs from them as ending themes and insert songs. The first soundtrack was made simultaneously with Virtual Rabbit, and was made by Hirasawa basing himself on production materials. Detonator Orgun 3 was entirely recorded on Hirasawa's private Studio Wireself.

Hirasawa eventually got tired of working on the series, and considered Detonator Orgun 3 to be the worst album of his solo career, yet also considers the experience helpful in making later soundtracks, in particular the music for the Berserk series, and regards the "grand and delicate" technique for orchestral tones he developed through this soundtrack as guidance for his later works in general. Series writer  enjoyed the soundtrack, later commissioning Hirasawa to compose for his fantasy manga Glory Wars; this music was later released as an image mini-album of the same name.

To promote the album, the remix of "Bandeira Travellers" (used as the ending theme of episode 1) was released a month ahead as a single and a sampler Mini CD, while the opening and ending themes of episode 1 were distributed to interested parties. In addition to the episode soundtracks, a drama CD was also released, containing select music from the soundtracks and audio from the series itself.

The series' main theme was included on the 2007 compilation Music For Movies: World of Susumu Hirasawa Soundtracks. Hirasawa had the soundtracks remastered for the 2012 boxset Haldyn Dome; his former record label did the same for the 2014 compilation Symphonic Code (since those were catalog-wide projects, songs that were also present on other albums were omitted to avoid duplication, being either included on earlier discs of the boxset or on the Archetype compilation). Glory Wars was bundled together with the soundtracks for these reissues.

Hirasawa has seldom brought up his soundtracks for the series in his overall career. Some P-Model material originated out of the soundtrack. In his 1994 shows, the title theme was played over the PA system before they began; Hirasawa usually opened his shows with "Frozen Beach '94", a rearrangement of "YOHKO Mitsurugi" with the lyrics of "Frozen Beach". A studio recording of this version, simply titled "FROZEN BEACH", was released a year later on the Scuba Recycle album.

Personnel
Susumu Hirasawa – Synthesizers, Drum machine, Sampler, Sequencers, Amiga 2500, Programming, Vocals, Electric guitar, Classical guitar, Production
 – Backing Vocals on "Bandeira Travellers"
Teru Uchida Strings – Strings on "Bandeira Travellers" and "SUNSET"
Jun Togawa – Vocals on "Clear Mountain Top"
, Osamu Takeuchi and Chūju Yamaguchi – Backing Vocals on "Clear Mountain Top"
Shingo Tomoda – Drums on "Venus"
Kayo "Kokubo" Matsumoto – Acoustic Piano on "Water in Time and Space (Full Size)"
 Section – Violins, Cellos, Violas and Contrabasses on "Root of Spirit"
Yoshiaki Kondo – Engineering on "Venus" and "Root of Spirit"
Masanori Chinzei – Engineering, Backing Vocals on "Clear Mountain Top"
Yūichi Kenjo – Executive Production, Backing Vocals on "Clear Mountain Top"
Michitaka Kikuchi – Illustrations (1 & 2)
Masami Ōbari – Illustrations (3)

Reception
Detonator Orgun has received mostly mixed reception. Ben Carlton of Manga Mania praised the series' art: "Tomoru lives in a future world which is bright, clean, and scarily antiseptic. The military look like plastic toys in their chunky armour and craft. [...] skies are as rich and beautiful as any in Macross Plus".  He also noted that: "Tomoru's world is also sharp and crisp as only anime can make it, with every edge and colour defined, giving more tension to the robot battles and dream sequences, where with every major change or impact the image loses definition in a sudden blur of brightness or shadow." On the other hand, Carlton criticized the UK dub's mixing, describing it as "sadly, disappointing, with uneven levels and what sounds like some nice music almost drowned out."

Helen McCarthy in 500 Essential Anime Movies called the anime an "intriguingly fresh take on the traditions of giant robot shows", noting that three "hour-long episodes allow plenty of time to develop concepts and characters".

Paul Thomas Chapman, writing retrospectively for Otaku USA, criticized the series, stating that "it starts off dull, proceeds to take an interesting twist and mangle it beyond recognition, and concludes in a manner that can only be described as complete and utter nonsense, even by anime standards". When he talks about a scene where Kumi moves the sun with telekinetic powers, Chapman states "I don't have enough exclamations points to describe how ridiculous that is." Comparing the series to other works by its staff, he notes that "it's no surprise that the themes explored in Detonator Orgun—trans-humanism, the loneliness of space, the cyclical nature of history, and the sense of futility experienced by cultures consumed by war—are so similar to those explored in Gall Force [...] But whereas Gall Force felt like a sincere work of popular science-fiction, Orgun feels like [Hideki] Kakinuma repeating himself, chewing over an idea he's already examined more thoroughly and with greater skill. As for future utopias and transformation as a metaphor for self-actualization, I've seen this kind of imagery from Masami Obari before and since," comparing the series to Angel Blade.

References

External links
 
 
 AnimeOnDVD review

1991 anime OVAs
1991 Japanese novels
1991 manga
Adventure anime and manga
Alien invasions in television
Anime International Company
Anime with original screenplays
Central Park Media
Kia Asamiya
Light novels
Mecha anime and manga